Nakhlan is a sub-district located in al-Sayyani District, Ibb Governorate, Yemen. Nakhlan had a population of 11203 according to the 2004 census.

References 

Sub-districts in As Sayyani District